Sproat Lake Provincial Park is a provincial park near Port Alberni in British Columbia, Canada's Vancouver Island.  Its name derives from a lake named after 19th century entrepreneur and colonial official Gilbert Malcolm Sproat.

Petroglyphs
One of the park's most significant features is a panel of petroglyphs called "K’ak’awin" on lakeshore rocks depicting mythological figures. Though little is known of the origin of the prehistoric images, the area has been traditionally occupied by the Hupacasath First Nation.

Park features
The 39-hectare park on Highway 4 is 15 kilometres west of Port Alberni and is a popular recreation area featuring swimming and boating in Sproat Lake and camping. On the north shore of the lake, there is a popular boat launch, a small beach and 58 vehicle-accessible campsites in the park. The park is near the home base of Coulson Flying Tankers, which operates Martin Mars water bombers.

References

External links

Sproat Lake Provincial Park Official Site
Martin Mars - Coulson Flying Tankers

Alberni Valley
Provincial parks of British Columbia
Rock art in North America
Petroglyphs in Canada
Protected areas established in 1966
1966 establishments in British Columbia